Iriya Station is the name of two train stations in Japan:

 Iriya Station (Kanagawa)
 Iriya Station (Tokyo)